Limulus clotting factor overbar C (factor C, limulus factor C) is an enzyme. This enzyme catalyses the following chemical reaction

 Selective cleavage of -Arg103-Ser- and -Ile124-Ile- bonds in limulus clotting factor B to form factor overbar B.
 Cleavage of -Pro-Arg- bonds in synthetic substrates

This enzyme is isolated from the hemocyte granules of the horseshoe crabs Limulus and Tachypleus, where is serves as a LPS endotoxin-sensitive trypsin type serine protease to protect the organism from bacterial infection, initiating a cascade leading to coagulin formation. From the N-terminus to the C-terminus, the domains are:
 EGF-like domain
 3 Sushi domains
 one LCCL domain and one C-type lectin domain
 2 more Sushi domains
 a trypsin domain

This enzyme is useful in Limulus amebocyte lysate as the endotoxin-detecting element. It can be produced recombinantly.

References

External links 
 

EC 3.4.21